The 2010 Copa Petrobras Santiago was a professional tennis tournament played on hard courts. It was the fourth edition of the tournament which was part of the 2010 ATP Challenger Tour. It took place in Santiago, Chile between 18 and 24 October 2010.

Singles main-draw entrants

Seeds

 Rankings are as of October 11, 2010.

Other entrants
The following players received wildcards into the singles main draw:
  Paul Capdeville
  Ricardo Hocevar
  Gonzalo Lama
  Martín Vassallo Argüello

The following players received a special entrant into the singles main draw:
  Nikola Ćirić

The following players received an alternate into the singles main draw:
  Júlio Silva

The following players received entry from the qualifying draw:
  Juan Pablo Brzezicki
  Leonardo Tavares (LL)
  Axel Michon
  Maxime Teixeira
  Goran Tošić

Champions

Singles

 Fabio Fognini def.  Paul Capdeville, 6–2, 7–6(2)

Doubles

 Daniel Muñoz de la Nava /  Rubén Ramírez Hidalgo def.  Nikola Ćirić /  Goran Tošić, 6–4, 6–2

External links
Official Site
ITF Search 
ATP official site

Copa Petrobras Santiago
Clay court tennis tournaments
Copa Petrobras Santiago
Copa